Protodiscoelius is a small Andean-Patagonian genus of potter wasps which contains two species.

References

 Willink, A. 1956. Una nueva especie de Discoelius Latr. (Hym. Eumenidae). Neotrópica, 2 (8): 54–58.

Potter wasps
Taxa named by Karl Wilhelm von Dalla Torre
Hymenoptera genera